FLIP is an animation festival primarily hosted by the Light House Media Centre in Wolverhampton, UK. It is one of two festivals hosted by Light House, the other of which is Deaffest. Official literature for the festival says that FLIP occurs annually at the beginning of November and attracts submissions from more than 30 countries worldwide. As well as screening the selected open submissions, FLIP also consists of special screenings, talks from professionals within the animation world, workshops, industry panels, portfolio reviews and competitions. The festival was set up, managed and programmed by Peter McLuskie between 2004 and 2011. It grew out of the 'Animation Forum', also based at Light House and which was later rebranded as Animation Forum West Midlands and found a home at Birmingham City University. In 2009 the festival was awarded a Black Country Tourism Award for Event of the Year.

The festival
Based in Wolverhampton, the festival began in 2004 and features a range of events from educational workshops for young people to experimental animation for grown ups; from industry led panels to feature film screenings and from international showcases and retrospectives of short films to spotlights on animation studios. FLIP is organised and hosted by Light House Media Centre in partnership with the University of Wolverhampton's School of Art and Design and School of Computing & IT, Wolverhampton Art Gallery. It is part funded by UK Film Council (National Lottery) through Screen West Midlands; Wolverhampton City Council; University of Wolverhampton; Business Link West Midlands and Animation Forum West Midlands.

Exhibitions
The exhibitions curated for FLIP tend to communicate the animation message through different media/outlets. They have a continuing partnership with Wolverhampton Art Gallery who programme specific works on site as part of the Festival. FLIP 2007 saw an exhibition of original puppets used in films such as The Corpse Bride, Mars Attacks! and Andy Pandy, and the puppet designer Nick Roberson answered questions from the audience. During FLIP 2008, the Light House building was home to large, moving, kinetic sculptures, by London-based artist Steve Hutton. As well as this, there was a screening of animated Doctor Who episodes from the 1960s followed by a talk on Doctor Who animation led by industry experts. 2009 saw a studio spotlight on the Glasgow-based Axis Animation who showcased some of their work and then answered questions from the audience. The other studio spotlight that year was from ArthurCox studios who also presented some of their work and then held a discussion with the audience.
2010's festival hosted a presentation from the creators of the LittleBigPlanet games, Media Molecule, as well as a display from Light House Media Centre's own animator is residence, Drew Roper, including his set for his award-winning film 'A History of Denim'.

In 2011, FLIP's exhibitions consisted of works by Barry JC Purves which included a book signing and display of the Tchaikovsky puppet, the Birmingham leg of GLI.TC/H festivals' submissions, as well as sketchbooks and artworks by Tori Davis and work from the 2011 feature film Rio, and maquettes from UK puppet makers Mackinnon & Saunders.

Recurring themes or programmes
FLIP offers visitors a chance to engage in ‘Big Screen Gaming’ in the smaller of the two cinemas. In 2009 Flip held a competition for participants to experience the Xbox 360 and one of its core games, Halo 3. This has then led to it becoming a regular feature at Light House with games such as the Fifa World Cup 2010 game and a Street Fighter game. 'Big Screen Gaming' returned for FLIP 2010 with one of the year's most hotly anticipated releases, Halo: Reach.

Another feature of FLIP Festival is the curated programme hosted by a guest curator from within the animation world. Previous years have been curated by Professor Paul Wells (Director of Animation, Loughborough University) and The Brothers McLeod whereas 2010 was curated by Clare Kitson, who is a former programmer at the National Film Theatre and between 1989 and 1999, commissioned Channel 4's animation.

The awards
The festival is a competition between animated films created using various techniques (stop motion, animated drawings, cut out paper, modelling clay, etc.) classified in to various award categories. These have included the following:

 Best of Festival
 Best UK Film
 Best International Film
 Best Newcomer
 Best Experimental Film 

FLIP also runs competitions for student films, created by current university/college students and, starting in 2010, for animators under the age of 18 years as well.

FLIP Festival 2011
FLIP Festival 2011 took place on 27–29 October 2011.

The Audience Choice winners of 2011's festival were:

 Bertie Crisp, Dir. Francesca Adams (UK)
 The Skeleton Woman, Dir. Sarah Van Den Boom (FRANCE)
 Dead Bird, Dir. Trevor Hardy (UK)
 Robin Hood, Dir, Ben Smith (UK)
 Caged, Dir. Ravi Maheru (UK)
 John and Betty, Dir. Alex Hancocks & Luke George (UK)

FLIP Festival 2010
FLIP Festival 2010 took place on 4–6 November 2010.

The award winners of 2010's festival were:
Best of Festival: Simon Cartwright & Jessica Cope with The Astronomer's Sun
Best International Film: Blu with Big Bang, Big Boom
Best Documentary: Samantha Moore with An Eyeful of Sound
Best Experimental Film: Will Anderson with Another Day
Best Sound: Elli Vuorinen with Tongueling
Best New Talent: Julia Gromskaya with L’Anima Mavi
Best Student Film: India Swift with Squid in Love
Student Runners up: Matthew Duddington with By its Clover; Ben Smallman with Tales of Beardyman

FLIP Festival 2009
2009's FLIP Festival took place on 5–7 November.

The award winners for 2009's Festival were:

 Best of Festival: Taku Kimura with Kudan.
 Best UK Film: Steve Irwin with Black Dogs Progress.
 Best International Film: Jake Armstrong with The Terrible Thing of Alpha 9, USA.
 Best Newcomer: Kristian Andrews with Rabbit Punch
 Best Experimental Film: Virginia Mori with Il Gioco de Silenzio (The Play of Silence).
 Best Stop Motion: Bang Yao Lui with Deadline
 Special Jury Mention: Ed Barrett with Man Up

FLIP Festival 2008
2008's FLIP Festival took place on 6–8 November.

The award winners for 2008's Festival were:

 Best Film: Blu with Muto.
 Best UK Film: Luis Cook with The Pearce Sisters.
 Best International Film: Jeremy Clapin with Skhizein.
 Best Abstract Film: Blu with Muto.
 Best Sound Design: Alexei Alexeev with KJFG No5.
 Best Newcomer: Tom Senior with One Nice Family Photo
 Best Student Film: Reza Dolatabadi with Khoda

FLIP Festival 2007
2007's FLIP Festival took place on 1–3 November.

The award winners for 2007's Festival were:

 Best Film: Lizzy Hobbs with The Old, Old, Very Old Man.
 Best Student Film: Paul O’Flanagan with Beauty Now.
 Special Mention (Student Film): Julian Kok with Mimos and the Egg.

Best of FLIP
FLIP Festival also does several small screenings throughout the year of either just the award winners or all the selected submissions. The "Best of FLIP" is usually shown at various venues throughout the West Midlands. For the 2010 season, FLIP had "best of" screenings at both the Stoke Film Theatre and the Wem Town Hall and there was also a special screening at Artsfest '10 in Birmingham, UK.

Notes

External links
 FLIP Festival’s website
 Light House Media Centre's website

Animation film festivals in the United Kingdom
Festivals in the West Midlands (county)
Film festivals established in 2004
Film festivals in England
Wolverhampton